Charles André (1841 – 1928) was a French architect, son of François André and among the first in a long line of French architects in the André family. He specialized in Haussmannian architecture, a style which became extremely prominent throughout France in the 19th Century. Beginning in 1901, he was a member of the École de Nancy.

Along with his son, Émile André, and Eugène Vallin, he was the architect of the Vaxelaire & Compagnie department store in Nancy, built between 1899 and 1901.

References 

1841 births
1928 deaths
Art Nouveau architects
19th-century French architects
Members of the École de Nancy